Rachael Kininmonth (born 16 December 1967 in Perth, Western Australia) is an Australian rower who competed in the women's eight at the 2000 Summer Olympics.

References

External links

Australian female rowers
Rowers at the 2000 Summer Olympics
Rowers from Perth, Western Australia
Living people
1967 births
Olympic rowers of Australia
20th-century Australian women